Oliver Bell (born May 13, 2004) is an American actor, based in Florida. He began his professional acting career at the age of eight. He is best known for his role as Little John/the Devil on the WGN America series Salem, and Little Boy in the HBO sci-fi series Westworld.

Personal life 
Bell was born in Florida, United States. He is of a Scottish/English descent.

Oliver is the son of champion British race car driver Justin Bell and the grandson of five time LeMans winning sports car driver Derek Bell.

Career 
Bell played the role of 'Young Richard' in the movie Some Kind of Beautiful. He also appeared as a main role in the show Salem, playing the role of 'Little Jon'. In 2016 he played the role of 'Little Boy' in the HBO series Westworld.

Filmography

Film

Television

References

External links 
 

2004 births
Living people
21st-century American male actors
American male child actors
American male film actors
American male television actors
American people of English descent
American people of Scottish descent
English male child actors
English male film actors
English male television actors
21st-century English male actors